Dichrorampha is a genus of moths belonging to the subfamily Olethreutinae of the family Tortricidae.

Species
Dichrorampha abhasica Danilevsky, in Danilevsky & Kuznetsov, 1968
Dichrorampha acuminatana (Lienig & Zeller, 1846)
Dichrorampha aeratana (Pierce & Metcalfe, 1915)
Dichrorampha agilana (Tengstrom, 1848)
Dichrorampha alaicana Rebel, 1910
Dichrorampha alatavica (Danilevsky, 1960)
Dichrorampha albicapitana (Walsingham, 1891)
Dichrorampha albimacula (Danilevsky, 1948)
Dichrorampha albistriana Komai, 1979
Dichrorampha alexandrae Passerin d'Entrves, 1972
Dichrorampha alpigenana Heinemann, 1863
Dichrorampha alpinana (Treitschke, in Ochsenheimer, 1830)
Dichrorampha altaica Danilevsky, in Danilevsky & Kuznetsov, 1968
Dichrorampha ambrosiana (Kennel, 1919)
Dichrorampha assumptana (Walker, 1863)
Dichrorampha aztecana Walsingham, 1914
Dichrorampha baixerasana Trematerra, 1991
Dichrorampha banana (Busck, 1906)
Dichrorampha bittana (Busck, 1906)
Dichrorampha broui Knudson, 1987
Dichrorampha bugnionana (Duponchel, in Godart, 1842)
Dichrorampha cacaleana (Herrich-Schffer, 1851)
Dichrorampha cancellatana Kennel, 1901
Dichrorampha canimaculana Komai, 1979
Dichrorampha caucasica (Danilevsky, 1948)
Dichrorampha chavanneana (Laharpe, 1858)
Dichrorampha cinerascens (Danilevsky, 1948)
Dichrorampha cinerosana (Herrich-Schffer, 1851)
Dichrorampha comptana (Walker, 1863)
Dichrorampha coniana Obraztsov, 1953
Dichrorampha consortana Stephens, 1852
Dichrorampha dana Kearfott, 1907
Dichrorampha danilevskyi Obraztsov, 1958
Dichrorampha dekanoidzei Esartiya, 1988
Dichrorampha dentivalva Huemer, 1996
Dichrorampha discedana (Danilevsky, 1960)
Dichrorampha distinctana (Herrich-Schffer, 1851)
Dichrorampha dzhungarica (Danilevsky, 1948)
Dichrorampha embolaea (Meyrick, 1918)
Dichrorampha euterpes Diakonoff, 1971
Dichrorampha eximia (Danilevsky, 1948)
Dichrorampha figurana (Zeller, 1877)
Dichrorampha filipjevi (Danilevsky, 1948)
Dichrorampha flavidorsana Knaggs, 1867
Dichrorampha forsteri Obraztsov, 1953
Dichrorampha gemellana (Zeller, 1847)
Dichrorampha gracilis (Danilevsky, 1948)
Dichrorampha gruneriana (Herrich-Schffer, 1851)
Dichrorampha hannemanni Kuznetzov, 1986
Dichrorampha harpeana Frey, 1870
Dichrorampha heegerana (Duponchel, in Godart, 1842)
Dichrorampha iberica Kuznetzov, 1972
Dichrorampha impuncta Komai, 1979
Dichrorampha incanana (Clemens, 1860)
Dichrorampha incognitana (Kremky & Mas owski, 1933)
Dichrorampha inconspiqua (Danilevsky, 1948)
Dichrorampha incursana (Herrich-Schffer, 1851)
Dichrorampha infuscata (Danilevsky, 1960)
Dichrorampha insperata (Danilevsky, 1960)
Dichrorampha interponana (Danilevsky, 1960)
Dichrorampha iranica Danilevsky, in Danilevsky & Kuznetsov, 1968
Dichrorampha iverica Esartiya, 1988
Dichrorampha klimeschiana Toll, 1955
Dichrorampha kuznetzovi Esartiya, 1988
Dichrorampha larsana (Danilevsky, 1960)
Dichrorampha lasithicana Rebel, 1916
Dichrorampha latiflavana Caradja, 1916
Dichrorampha leopardana (Busck, 1906)
Dichrorampha letarfensis Gibeaux, 1983
Dichrorampha ligulana (Herrich-Schffer, 1851)
Dichrorampha livens (Walsingham, 1891)
Dichrorampha manilkara Heppner, 1981
Dichrorampha marginestriana (Filipjev, 1925)
Dichrorampha marmarocyma (Meyrick, in Caradja, 1931)
Dichrorampha montanana (Duponchel, in Godart, 1842)
Dichrorampha niculescui (St noiu & Neme, 1974)
Dichrorampha nigrobrunneana (Toll, 1942)
Dichrorampha obscuratana (Wolff, 1955)
Dichrorampha okui Komai, 1979
Dichrorampha pastoralisi Razowski & Tokr, 2003
Dichrorampha pentheriana (Rebel, 1917)
Dichrorampha petiverella (Linnaeus, 1758)
Dichrorampha piperana (Busck, 1906)
Dichrorampha plumbana (Scopoli, 1763)
Dichrorampha podoliensis (Toll, 1942)
Dichrorampha proxima (Danilevsky, 1948)
Dichrorampha radicicolana Walsingham, 1879
Dichrorampha rejectana (Laharpe, 1858)
Dichrorampha rilana Drenovski, 1909
Dichrorampha rjabovi (Danilevsky, 1948)
Dichrorampha sapodilla Heppner, 1981
Dichrorampha sedatana (Busck, 1906)
Dichrorampha senectana Guenee, 1845
Dichrorampha sequana (Hubner, [1796-1799])
Dichrorampha sericana (Kennel, 1901)
Dichrorampha simpliciana (Haworth, [1811])
Dichrorampha simulana (Clemens, 1860)
Dichrorampha sinensis Kuznetzov, 1971
Dichrorampha striatimacula Kuznetzov, 1972
Dichrorampha sugii Kawabe, 1989
Dichrorampha sylvicolana Heinemann, 1863
Dichrorampha tayulingensis Kawabe, 1986
Dichrorampha teichiana ulcs & Kerppola, 1997
Dichrorampha testacea Komai, 1979
Dichrorampha thomanni Huemer, 1991
Dichrorampha tianshanica (Danilevsky, 1960)
Dichrorampha tshetverikovi (Danilevsky, 1960)
Dichrorampha typhlodes (Meyrick, 1931)
Dichrorampha unicolor (Danilevsky, 1948)
Dichrorampha uralensis (Danilevsky, 1948)
Dichrorampha vacivana (Chrtien, 1925)
Dichrorampha vancouverana McDunnough, 1935
Dichrorampha velata Schmid & Huemer, 2021

See also
List of Tortricidae genera

References

External links
tortricidae.com

Grapholitini
Tortricidae genera
Taxa named by Achille Guenée